Martin Walser (born 24 March 1927) is a German writer.

Life

Walser was born in Wasserburg am Bodensee, on Lake Constance. His parents were coal merchants, and they also kept an inn next to the train station in Wasserburg.  He described the environment in which he grew up in his novel Ein springender Brunnen (English: A Gushing Fountain).  From 1938 to 1943 he was a pupil at the secondary school in Lindau and served in an anti-aircraft unit.  According to documents released in June 2007, at the age of 17 he became a member of the Nazi Party on 20 April 1944, though Walser denied that he knowingly entered the party, a claim disputed by historian Juliane Wetzel. By the end of the Second World War, he was a soldier in the Wehrmacht.  After the war he returned to his studies and completed his Abitur in 1946.  He then studied literature, history, and philosophy at the University of Regensburg and the University of Tübingen.  He received his doctorate in literature in 1951 for a thesis on Franz Kafka, written under the supervision of Friedrich Beißner.

While studying, Walser worked as a reporter for the Süddeutscher Rundfunk radio station, and wrote his first radio plays. In 1950, he married Katharina "Käthe" Neuner-Jehle. He has four daughters from this marriage: Franziska Walser is an actress, Alissa Walser is a writer-and-painter, and Johanna and Theresia Walser are professional writers. Johanna has occasionally published in collaboration with her father. German journalist Jakob Augstein is Walser's illegitimate son from a relationship with translator Maria Carlsson.<ref>Gerrit Bartels: Augstein und Walser. Vater und Sohn: Eine gewisse Ähnlichkeit. In: Der Tagesspiegel. 28 November 2009. Retrieved 25 March 2012.</ref>

Beginning in 1953 Walser was regularly invited to conferences of the Gruppe 47 (Group 47), which awarded him a prize for his story Templones Ende (English: Templone's End) in 1955. His first novel Ehen in Philippsburg (English: Marriages in Philippsburg) was published in 1957 and was a huge success. Since then Walser has been working as a freelance author. His most important work is Ein fliehendes Pferd (English: A Runaway Horse), published 1978, which was both a commercial and critical success.

Walser received the Georg Büchner Prize in 1981.

In 2004 Walser left his long-time publisher Suhrkamp Verlag for Rowohlt Verlag, after the death of Suhrkamp director Siegfried Unseld.  An unusual clause in his contract with Suhrkamp Verlag made it possible for Walser take publishing rights over all of his works with him. According to Walser, a decisive factor in instigating the switch was the lack of active support by his publisher during the controversy over his novel Tod eines Kritikers (English: "Death of a Critic").

Walser is a member of Akademie der Künste (Academy of Arts) in Berlin, Sächsische Akademie der Künste (Saxon Academy of Arts), Deutsche Akademie für Sprache und Dichtung (German Academy for Language and Poetry) in Darmstadt, and member of the German P.E.N.

In 2007 the German political magazine Cicero placed Walser second on its list of the 500 most important German intellectuals, just behind Pope Benedict XVI and ahead of Nobel Prize winner Günter Grass.

Political engagement

From Left to Right
Walser has also been known for his political activity.  In 1964, he attended the Frankfurt Auschwitz Trial, which was considered an important moment in the development of West German political consciousness regarding the recent German past. He was involved in protests against the Vietnam War.  During the late 1960s, Walser, like many leftist German intellectuals including Günter Grass, supported Willy Brandt for the election to the office of chancellor of West Germany. In the 1960s and 1970s Walser moved further to the left and was considered a sympathizer of the West German Communist Party.  He was friends with leading German Marxists such as Robert Steigerwald and even visited Moscow during this time. By the 1980s, Walser began shifting back to the political right, though he denied any substantive change of attitude. In 1988 he gave a series of lectures entitled "Speeches About One's Own Country," in which he made clear that he considered German division to be a painful gap which he could not accept. This topic was also the topic of his story "Dorle und Wolf".

Peace Prize of the German Book Trade
In 1998 Walser was awarded the Peace Prize of the German Book Trade.  His acceptance speech, given in the former Church of St. Paul (Paulskirche) in Frankfurt, invoked issues of historical memory and political engagement in contemporary German politics and unleashed a controversy that roiled German intellectual circles. Walser's acceptance speech was titled:  ("Experiences when writing the regular soapbox-speech"):

At first the speech did not cause a great stir. Indeed, the audience present in Church of St. Paul received the speech with applause, though Walser's critic Ignatz Bubis did not applaud, as confirmed by television footage of the event. Some days after the event, and again on 9 November 1998, the 60th anniversary of the Kristallnacht pogrom against German Jews, Bubis, president of the Central Council of Jews in Germany, accused Walser of "intellectual arson" and claimed that Walser's speech was both "trying to block out history or, respectively, to eliminate the remembrance" and pleading "for a culture of looking away and thinking away". Then the controversy started. As described by Karsten Luttmer: Walser replied by accusing Bubis to have stepped out of dialog between people. Afterward, Bubis withdrew his claim that Walser had been intentionally incendiary, but Walser maintained that there was no misinterpretation by his opponents.

Death of a Critic
In his 2002 roman-à-clef Death of a Critic, Martin Walser denounced the one of the most prominent literary critics in Germany, Marcel Reich-Ranicki, labeling him as a symbol of a corrupted cultural milieu as well as attacking his person. Its publication started a scandal, especially considering Reich-Ranicki's Jewish heritage and Walser's former membership in the Nazi Party. Even before the novel was fully released, the book was hotly debated. On 29 May, months before the book's August release date, Frank Schirrmacher, editor of the Frankfurter Allgemeine Zeitung, wrote an open letter to Walser to inform him that contrary to tradition, an excerpt from his book would not be published in the feuilleton of the FAZ: "This book is an execution, a settlement of accounts, a document of hate", he wrote. The FAZ continued to publish expressions of support for Marcel Reich-Ranicki, who was Schirrmacher's predecessor at the FAZ. Its arch-rival daily paper, the Süddeutsche Zeitung from Munich, supported Walser.

Reich-Ranicki commented himself in May 2010 in an interview with Der Spiegel: "I don't think that he is an anti-Semite. But it is important to him to demonstrate that the critic, who allegedly tortured him most, is a Jew, too. He expects his public to follow him in this. You see, there never was an anti-Semitic line or remark from Grass, not one. And I certainly haven't written only positively about his books."

Works
In German – and in English, if translatedBeschreibung einer Form: Versuch über die epische Dichtung Franz Kafkas (1951)Ein Flugzeug über dem Haus und andere Geschichten (1955)Ehen in Philippsburg (1957) – The Gadarene Club (1960) / Marriage in Philippsburg (1961)Halbzeit (1960)Eiche und Angora: Eine deutsche Chronik (1962) – The Rabbit Race (1963)Überlebensgroß Herr Krott: Requiem für einen Unsterblichen (1964)Lügengeschichten (1964)Erfahrungen und Leseerfahrungen (1965)Das Einhorn (1966) – The Unicorn (1983)Der Abstecher, Die Zimmerschlacht (1967)Heimatkunde: Aufsätze und Reden (1968)Ein Kinderspiel: Stück in zwei Akten (1970)Fiction: Erzählung (1970)Aus dem Wortschatz unserer Kämpfe(1971)Die Gallistl’sche Krankheit (1972)Der Sturz (1973)Das Sauspiel: Szenen aus dem 16. Jahrhundert (1975)Jenseits der Liebe (1976) – Beyond All Love (1983)Ein fliehendes Pferd (1978) – Runaway Horse: A Novel (also 1978)Seelenarbeit (1979) – The Inner Man (1984)Das Schwanenhaus (1980) – The Swan Villa (1983)Selbstbewußtsein und Ironie (1981)Brief an Lord Liszt (1982) – Letter to Lord Liszt (1985)In Goethes Hand: Szenen aus dem 19. Jahrhundert (1982)Liebeserklärungen (1983)Brandung (1985) – Breakers: A Novel (1988)Meßmers Gedanken (1985)Geständnis auf Raten (1986)Die Amerikareise: Versuch, ein Gefühl zu verstehen (with André Ficus, 1986)Dorle und Wolf: Eine Novelle (1987) – No Man’s Land (1988)Jagd: Roman (1988)Über Deutschland reden (1988)Die Verteidigung der Kindheit: Roman (1991)Das Sofa (written 1961) (1992)Ohne einander: Roman (1993)Vormittag eines Schriftstellers (1994)Kaschmir in Parching: Szenen aus der Gegenwart (1995)Finks Krieg: Roman (1996)Deutsche Sorgen (1997)Heimatlob: Ein Bodensee-Buch (with André Ficus, 1998)Ein springender Brunnen: Roman (1998) – A Gushing Fountain (2015)Der Lebenslauf der Liebe: Roman (2000)Tod eines Kritikers: Roman (2002)Meßmers Reisen (2003)Der Augenblick der Liebe: Roman (2004)Die Verwaltung des Nichts: Aufsätze (2004)Leben und Schreiben: Tagebücher 1951–1962 (2005)Angstblüte: Roman (2006)Der Lebensroman des Andreas Beck (2006)Das geschundene Tier: Neununddreißig Balladen (2007)
The Burden of the Past: Martin Walser on Modern German Identity (in English, 2008)Ein liebender Mann: Roman (2008)Mein Jenseits: Novelle (2010)Ein sterbender Mann (2016)Statt etwas, oder Der letzte Rank (2017)

References

External links

 
Audio clip from the novel "Ein liebender Mann" (2008), read out on Literaturport.de by Martin Walser himself (in German)
Audio clip from the novel "Angstblüte" (2006) on Literaturport.de (in German)

1927 births
Living people
People from Lindau (district)
20th-century German novelists
21st-century German novelists
Writers from Bavaria
German Army personnel of World War II
Recipients of the Pour le Mérite (civil class)
University of Regensburg alumni
University of Tübingen alumni
Members of the European Academy of Sciences and Arts
Schiller Memorial Prize winners
Georg Büchner Prize winners
Knights Commander of the Order of Merit of the Federal Republic of Germany
Members of the Academy of Arts, Berlin
German male novelists
German male dramatists and playwrights
20th-century German dramatists and playwrights
21st-century German dramatists and playwrights
Members of the German Academy for Language and Literature
20th-century German male writers
21st-century German male writers
Nazi Party members
Luftwaffenhelfer